Brian DeWayne Ingram (born October 31, 1959) is a former American football linebacker. He played for the New England Patriots from 1982 to 1986 and for the San Diego Chargers in 1987.

References

1959 births
Living people
American football linebackers
Tennessee Volunteers football players
New England Patriots players
San Diego Chargers players